Adora Oleh, is a British born Nigerian TV presenter and the first co-host of MTN Project Fame, which she co-hosted for five years. On Sunday 8 December 2013, Adora Oleh won the most popular female TV presenter award in Nigerian Broadcasters Awards which took place in Lagos. She used to host her talk show – "The Adora Oleh Show" on Vox Africa, an entertainment programme which focuses on positive role models and entrepreneurs making waves (especially entertainment, fashion, and business).

Early life and education 
Adora Oleh was born and raised in Surrey, England as the eldest of three children of her parents. Adora studied law in the university and holds a postgraduate Diploma in Media Law and Journalism and another postgraduate in Public Relations from the London School of Journalism.

Career

Hosting & journalism
She worked at MTV Base in 2002. Alongside Joseph Benjamin, she cohosted Project Fame West Africa, a music talent TV reality show in 2009 and was the host for consecutive 5 years. 
Adora in 2012 made her debut as a television presenter on American TV Station on Fox News. On this job, she covered the birth of Prince Williams first royal baby.
She then presented on the fashion TV station, TOPSHOP TV in London as a Fashion Correspondent where she reviews key fashion trends when she interview top designers and models. 
She and her sister, Chika Oleh are the co-owners of Chiad TV Productions, a television production and events company.
Her talk show 'The Adora Oleh Show' was produced by her productions company and aired on AIT, DSTV Nigeria Silverbird TV and SKY's VOX Africa UK. She was the co host of the show Nigeria's Top Model which was created by Tyra Banks.

Modeling
In 2012 Adora was part of the judging panel for Lagos Fashion and Design Week: Young designers of the year. At the event, she was also the muse for the California born Nigerian fashion designer, Emmy Collins first female couture line.

Awards & Ambassadorship 
Adora become the African Ambassador in 2013 for Guinness ‘Snapp’, an apple cocktail beverage. She was nominated at the 2013 Exquisite Lady of the Year Awards(ELOY) for 'Brand Ambassador of the Year' as the ambassador for SNAPP.

In 2013, in the Most Popular Female TV Presenter category  at the Nigerian Broadcasters Merit Awards she was nominated. Adora took home the award as she ended up the winner.

References

Living people
People from Surrey
Nigerian television presenters
Nigerian women television presenters
Year of birth missing (living people)
Alumni of the London School of Journalism